The 1996 Nichirei International Championships was a tennis tournament played on outdoor hard courts at the Ariake Coliseum in Tokyo, Japan that was part of Tier II of the 1996 WTA Tour. It was the seventh and final edition of the tournament and was held from September 16 through September 22, 1996. First-seeded Monica Seles won the singles title, her third at the event after 1991 and 1992.

Finals

Singles

 Monica Seles defeated  Arantxa Sánchez Vicario 6–1, 6–4
 It was Seles' 4th singles title of the year and the 38th of her career.

Doubles

 Amanda Coetzer /  Mary Pierce defeated  Sung-Hee Park /  Shi-Ting Wang 6–3, 7–6
 It was Coetzer's only title of the year and the 9th of her career. It was Pierce's only title of the year and the 9th of her career.

References

External links
 ITF tournament edition details
 Tournament draws

Nichirei International Championships
Nichirei International Championships
1996 in Japanese tennis
1996 in Japanese women's sport